Wasi-wari (Vasi-vari, Wasi-weri) is the language of the Wasi people, spoken in a few villages in the Pârun Valley (Prasun Valley) in Afghanistan. It also goes by the name Prasun or Paruni.

Vasi-vari belongs to the Indo-European language family, and is on the Nuristani group of the Indo-Iranian branch. Vasi-vari is the most isolated of the Nuristani languages.

As far as is known, its speakers are 100% Muslim. Literacy rates are low: below 1% for people who have it as a first language, and between 15% and 25% for people who have it as a second language.

Demographics
Wasi-wari is a language spoken by the Vâs’i people who are located in the Pârun Valley, known as Vâs’i gul, at the beginning of the Pech River Basin in the Nurestân Province of Northeastern Afghanistan.  The Vâs’i refer to the language as Vâs’i-vari or Vâs’i-vare, but it is also known as Prasuni, Paruni, Parun, Vasi-vari, Prasun, Veron, Verou, Veruni, Wasi-veri, Wasi-weri, Wasin-veri, Vasi Vari, and Pārūnī.  The population of Vâs’i gul is between 3000-6000, and there are approximately 8000 native speakers, which makes it a vulnerable language.

Dialects
Wasi-wari is broken up into three dialects that are spoken in six villages.  The upper dialect, Ṣup'u-vari, is spoken in the northernmost village, Ṣup'u.  The central dialect, üšʹüt-üćʹü-zumʹu-vari, is spoken in the middle four villages, S’eć, Üć’ü, Üšʹüt, and Zum’u.  The Lower dialect, Uṣ'üt-var’e, is spoken in Uṣ'üt, the lowest village.

Classification
Wasi-wari is part of the Nuristani branch of the Indo-Iranian languages, which has both Iranian and Indo-Aryan influences.  Nuristani languages were formerly considered to be Dardic languages, however, they are dissimilar enough from the other Dardic languages to constitute their own branch of the Indo-Iranian language tree.  There was also previously confusion on whether Wasi-wari and Prasun were the same or separate languages, but it was determined that both names referred to the same language.  Although it is substantially different from the other Nuristâni languages, Wasi-wari forms the northern cluster of Nuristâni languages with Kâmk’ata-Mumkst’a-vari, so they share some similarities.

Phonology

Vowels
Wasi-wari has eight vowels, â, u, o, i, e, ü, ö, and the unmarked vowel, a, which is pronounced as a high central vowel, [ɨ].  Long vowels are denoted with :, such as [i:].

Pronouns

Numerals

References

External links
 Prasuni at the Endangered Languages Project

Languages of Afghanistan
Nuristani languages